Pierre Palmade (born 23 March 1968) is a French actor, comedian, stage director and playwright.

Biography
Pierre Palmade began his career in sketch comedy shows on stage and on television in the late 1980s, and in the 1990s he wrote and played his own stand-up acts. His signature humor was to portray unpleasant or irritating characters in his sketches. Palmade also wrote several plays with Muriel Robin, with whom they were notable in the 1990s for their play Ils s'aiment and its sequel Ils se sont aimés, both directed by Muriel Robin and played on stage by Palmade and Michèle Laroque. For his theater work, Palmade has been nominated several times for the Molière Awards.

In the late 1990s and 2000s, Palmade played in several films and TV series. In 2005, he participated in Rendez-vous en terre inconnue. He also worked as a writer for the films Pédale douce and Pédale dure. In 2007, he was the host of sketch comedy television show Made in Palmade; the following year, he wrote the play Le comique, which he played on stage with fellow actors from Made in Palmade and was followed by a sequel, Le Fils du Comique with Anne-Élisabeth Blateau at Théâtre Saint-Georges in Paris. In 2008, Palmade starred in the biographical film Sagan, a dramatization of the life of novelist Françoise Sagan directed by Diane Kurys, in which Palmade plays the role of dancer and socialite Jacques Chazot.

In 2010, after a ten-year hiatus from on-stage solo performances, Palmade came back with a new show J'ai jamais été aussi vieux. That same year, Palmade wrote the sketch comedy Le Grand Restaurant, featuring various celebrities such as Palmade, Anne-Élisabeth Blateau, Gérard Depardieu, François Berléand and Jean Rochefort. The prime-time television show was followed by three sequels, as of 2022. In 2018, Palmade wrote the play Paprika, played on stage at Théâtre de la Madeleine by Victoria Abril and Jean-Baptiste Maunier.

Personal life 
Palmade was married to singer Véronique Sanson from 1995 to 2004. In October 2008, Palmade came out as a homosexual, his homosexuality was one of the topics of his 2010 autobiographical play J'ai jamais été aussi vieux.

In an interview in 2019, after being arrested for drug use, he publicly admitted he suffered from drug addiction, declaring: "Cocaine has ruined my life since I was 20".

Legal issues 
Palmade was convicted of cocaine use in 1995. He was arrested again for cocaine use in 2019, for which he pleaded guilty.

On 10 February 2023, Palmade was responsible for causing a car accident, colliding head-on with another vehicle travelling on the other lane near Villiers-en-Bière in the south of Seine-et-Marne. Palmade was sent to the hospital in critical condition at the Kremlin-Bicêtre's hospital but recovered the next day, and his life was no longer in danger. The other car was carrying a pregnant woman, her brother-in-law, the driver of the vehicle, and his six-year-old child. Due to trauma of the accident, the 27-year-old woman was taken to the hospital, where she had an emergency caesarean section. Her seven-months old baby died.

The day after the accident, the lives of the vehicle's three occupants were "still in danger". Two passengers in Palmade's car had fled after the collision. An investigation into possible manslaughter began following a toxicology report; it was found that Palmade was driving under the influence of cocaine. On 12 February, the woman's life was no longer in danger, but the man and his child remained in critical condition. On 14 February 2023, the victims' lawyer announced that the 27-year-old woman's baby "is said to have been born alive, but this has to be confirmed by the experts". The advocate also stated that the 38-year-old driver of the vehicle and his six-year-old son were still in the intensive care unit; the child has a "fractured jaw" and is "disfigured".

Stage plays 
 Ils s'aiment (1996, co-written with Muriel Robin)
 Ils se sont aimés (2001, co-written with Muriel Robin)
 Le Comique (2008)
 J'ai jamais été aussi vieux (2010)
 Le fils du comique (2013)
 Ils se re-aiment (2016)
 Paprika (2018)
 Assume, bordel ! (2020)

Filmography
 Oui, directed by Alexandre Jardin (1996)
 Asterix and Obelix vs. Caesar, directed by Claude Zidi (1999) : Cacofonix
 Asterix and the Vikings, (voice), directed by Stefan Fjeldmark (2006) : Cryptograf
 Sagan, directed by Diane Kurys, with Sylvie Testud (2008) : Jacques Chazot
 Pierre et Fils, with Pierre Richard, violin Scott Tixier, music Christophe Defays TF1 (2008)
 Incognito, directed by Éric Lavaine (2009)
 Brillantissime, directed by Michèle Laroque (2018)

References

External links
 

1968 births
Living people
Bisexual male actors
Knights of the Ordre national du Mérite
French humorists
Bisexual comedians
French LGBT writers
French male film actors
French male television actors
French male stage actors
Male actors from Bordeaux
French male writers